Brian Cordy (born 14 January 1961) is a former Australian rules footballer who played in the Victorian Football League (VFL) between 1981 and 1988 for the Footscray Football Club.

He played in 124 games and kicked 18 goals, including all 25 games in 1985, one of Footscray's most successful seasons ever. He played his final game in 1988 against Hawthorn in Round 14.

His older brother Neil and younger brother Graeme played alongside Brian for Footscray. His sons Ayce and Zaine were drafted in 2008 and 2014 respectively, by the Bulldogs under the Father-Son Rule.

References

External links

1961 births
Living people
Western Bulldogs players
Traralgon Football Club players
Australian rules footballers from Victoria (Australia)
Victorian State of Origin players